Geoid Glacier is a glacier flowing south from the Thomas Heights, to the west of Ellipsoid Hill, into Blue Glacier, Victoria Land, Antarctica. The name is one of a group in the area associated with surveying applied in 1993 by the New Zealand Geographic Board, the geoid being the particular equipotential surface which coincides with mean sea level.

References

Glaciers of Victoria Land
Scott Coast